Thomas Booth-Amos (born 12 March 1996) is a British motorcycle rider.

Career
He competed full-time in the FIM CEV Moto3 Junior World Championship in 2018.

As a member of the British Talent Team he graduated into Grand Prix racing the following season with support of the series' commercial rights holder Dorna.

He raced in the World Supersport 300 Championship in 2020 and 2021 with a successful second season finishing 2nd in the championship. For 2022 he graduated to the World Supersport Championship.

Career statistics

Grand Prix motorcycle racing

By season

Races by year
(key) (Races in bold indicate pole position; races in italics indicate fastest lap)

Supersport 300 World Championship

Races by year
(key)

Supersport World Championship

Races by year
(key) (Races in bold indicate pole position; races in italics indicate fastest lap)

 Season still in progress.

References

External links

1996 births
Living people
English motorcycle racers
Moto3 World Championship riders
Supersport 300 World Championship riders
Supersport World Championship riders